Wu Yu-jen (born 5 February 1969) is a member of the Kuomintang who was in the Legislative Yuan in Taiwan.

Political careers

See also

 List of members of the eighth Legislative Yuan

References

External links

  

1969 births
Living people
Kuomintang Members of the Legislative Yuan in Taiwan
Members of the 8th Legislative Yuan
Alumni of the University of Warwick